The president of Florida State University is the executive officer of the Florida State University board of trustees, and, essentially, the leader of the university.  Florida State's campus is in Tallahassee, Florida. Although the institution was officially founded on January 24, 1851, it officially became a Liberal Arts College in 1897.

Florida State is a senior member of the State University System of Florida. Founded in 1851, it is located on the oldest continuous site of higher education in the state of Florida.

The university is classified as a Research University with Very High Research by the Carnegie Foundation for the Advancement of Teaching. The university comprises 16 separate colleges and more than 110 centers, facilities, labs and institutes that offer more than 360 programs of study, including professional school programs. The university has an annual budget of over $1.7 billion. Florida State is home to Florida's only National Laboratory – the National High Magnetic Field Laboratory and is the birthplace of the commercially viable anti-cancer drug Taxol. Florida State University also operates The John & Mable Ringling Museum of Art, the State Art Museum of Florida and one of the largest museum/university complexes in the nation.

The university is accredited by the Southern Association of Colleges and Schools (SACS). Florida State University is home to nationally ranked programs in many academic areas, including law, business, engineering, medicine, social policy, film, music, theater, dance, visual art, political science, psychology, social work, and the sciences.

The school's name did not reach the present form until 1945, going through a number of different names between 1851 and 1945. From 1857 to 1887, the school's leader was given the title of "Principal".

In the fall of 2014, Florida State University chose their fifteenth president, John E. Thrasher. He is a Florida State University alum and former state legislator, businessman, and lawyer. He was approved by the Florida Board of Governors on November 6, 2014, and took office on November 10, 2014.

List of presidents

Timeline of Florida State University presidential terms

See also 

 Florida State Seminoles
 History of Florida State University
 List of Florida State University people

References

External links
 Presidents of FSU – Official website of Florida State University, Office of the President.
FSU Board of Trustees procedures

Florida State